Cutting Crew are  an English rock band formed in London in 1985. They are best known for their debut album Broadcast and hit single, "(I Just) Died in Your Arms".

History

1985–1986: Formation
While still in his teens, Nick Van Eede (born Nicholas Eede) recorded a few UK solo singles in the late 1970s, and later was in the band The Drivers, which found success in Canada, particularly with their 1982 single "Tears on Your Anorak".  While touring Canada, the Drivers had a support band called Fast Forward, whose line up included guitarist Kevin MacMichael. Van Eede was so impressed with MacMichael's guitar playing that he asked him to form a new band with him. The Drivers split in 1983, but Van Eede and MacMichael joined forces in 1985 by relocating to London, England. Initially, the two made demos that led to a recording contract, before bassist Colin Farley and drummer Martin "Frosty" Beedle joined in 1986.

1986–1988: Broadcast and breakthrough
Their first album, Broadcast, was released on Virgin Records in 1986. The song "(I Just) Died in Your Arms" was mixed in London at Utopia Studios by Tim Palmer. Although Virgin Records was already a major label in the UK, their debut song, "(I Just) Died in Your Arms", provided the first US hit for Virgin as a full-fledged label. This song release quickly helped the band gain popularity. Virgin flew the band to New York City for initial recordings of the album, then to Australia to shoot music videos. The unknown band shot to No. 1 in the major US market, as well as smaller markets such as Canada and Norway, with their debut single. Their most popular single, it was a multiformat success in the US, where it also reached number four on the Hot Mainstream Rock Tracks chart, No. 24 on the Hot Adult Contemporary Tracks chart and—in an extended remix version—No. 37 on the Hot Dance/Club Play chart.  The song peaked at No. 4 in another major market, the UK Singles Chart, as well as becoming a hit in the smaller Switzerland and South Africa markets. It went to No. 2 in Sweden and Ireland, and No. 9 in Austria. Keyboardist Tony Moore joined in 1986 and was a touring member of the band through 1988. 

The choice for follow-up single in the UK had been "I've Been In Love Before", but that song spent only three weeks in the UK Top 40, peaking at No. 31.  Their choice for follow-up single in the US was their third UK release, "One for the Mockingbird", but the song was a relative commercial disappointment on both sides of the Atlantic, just cracking the Top 40 of the Hot 100 at No. 38 and hitting No. 29 on the Mainstream Rock chart in the US, No. 47 in Canada and No. 52 in the UK Singles Chart.

The band took a chance on "I've Been in Love Before" again, this time with greater success. The song became Cutting Crew's second US Top 10 on the Hot 100, peaking at No. 9, and was their first major hit on the US Adult Contemporary chart, where it peaked at No. 2. This success prompted a UK re-release, and this time it spent five weeks in the UK Singles Chart Top 40, peaking at No. 24. The song failed to chart throughout most of Europe, but it peaked at No. 8 in Canada. Despite an unflattering review by Rolling Stone magazine, Cutting Crew received a Grammy nomination as the Best New Artist of 1987.

1988–1990: The Scattering
Disputes with management led to a long recording hiatus, which stalled the band's career momentum. Cutting Crew's second album, The Scattering, was finally released in early 1989. Its lead single, "(Between a) Rock and a Hard Place", (CA 54, UK 66, U.S. 77) failed to reach the Top 40. Van Eede's vocal style, however, did score a sizeable US Adult Contemporary hit with "Everything But My Pride."  That song peaked at No. 4 and stayed in the top 50 for 22 weeks.  It climbed to No. 72 on the Canadian pop charts, though it failed to hit the US Hot 100. The prophetically named "The Last Thing" scaled the AC charts as high as No. 17 in early 1990 and went to No. 90 on the Canadian chart, and has been their final chart hit to date. Although a video for the title track did air briefly in the UK and North America, The Scattering failed to chart.

1991–1992: Compus Mentus
Recorded at The Mill Studios in Cookham, Berkshire on the Thames and produced by Chris Neil. Farley and Beedle left the group in 1991 with no replacement, leaving only Eede and MacMichael in the group. Eede sang and played keys and MacMichael played all guitars (lead and bass). Standout tracks are "Frigid as England" written by Jeff Lowe, the plaintive "Sweet Auburn" and the darkly comic, "Don't Let It Bring You Down."

The album spawned one single, "If That's The Way You Want It." Neither the single nor the album itself charted. Within weeks of its release, Virgin Records was bought by EMI and the album became obsolete.

1993–2005: Break-up and MacMichael's death
The band broke up in 1993; shortly after the release of their Compus Mentus album. After the break-up, MacMichael joined forces with Robert Plant and played on his Fate of Nations album. On 31 December 2002, MacMichael died of lung cancer at the Queen Elizabeth II Health Sciences Centre in Halifax, Nova Scotia, at the age of 51.

2005–2014: Reformation
In 2003, Van Eede formed the group Grinning Souls. This group independently released the album Capture in 2005. The following year, Van Eede took the decision to re-release the album under the title Grinning Souls, this time crediting the work to Cutting Crew. Grinning Souls (the band) became Cutting Crew for all subsequent live work: Van Eede was the only original Cutting Crew member in the group.

The new band toured in Germany, Norway, the UK, Canada, Hungary, Switzerland and the USA with, amongst others, ABC, Berlin, Wang Chung, Supertramp, Level 42 and Midge Ure. In 2008, Cutting Crew signed a US deal with label Spectra Records.

2015–2019: Add to Favourites
In October 2015, Cutting Crew released their fifth studio album, Add to Favourites, through In Red Flynn label, via Cherry Red Records. It features "Till the Money Run$ Out", which was released as the first single on 4 September 2015. The band line up included guitarists Gareth Moulton and Joolz Dunkley, bassist Nick Kay, keyboardist Jono Harrison, drummer Martyn Barker and the Blackjack Horns. The band embarked on a UK tour shortly after its release.

2020–present: Ransomed Healed Restored Forgiven
At the end of 2018, Cutting Crew had announced, through their social networks, they had plans to release a new album featuring "new songs and new versions of CC classics." Although they did not have any new releases for 2019, a press release made by January of the following year announced the release for their second official worldwide compilation album titled Ransomed Healed Restored Forgiven, featuring nine songs from their past catalogue reworked as orchestral renditions, as well as other versions. Soon afterwards, the release date was announced on 27 March 2020 by Van Eede in a short video through the Cutting Crew official Facebook page. On the same day, they released the lead single for this project, an 8-track digital EP of their signature song "(I Just) Died in Your Arms", which also received a physical release, as well as a brand new video for the song uploaded on YouTube. The album was released on 24 April 2020, through August Day label, on digital platforms such as Spotify and Apple Music. But due to logistics limitations during the COVID-19 pandemic, its physical release was delayed until 8 May 2020. Along with its other formats there is a limited box edition containing 3 different CDs, as well as the physical CD edition of the reworked (I Just) Died in Your Arms EP, and a postcard signed by Van Eede himself. To promote the album, Van Eede spoke to several media outlets, such as American Songwriter and Forbes.
This greatest hits album has since spawned two more singles, the orchestral version of the Broadcast single "One for the Mockingbird", and the orchestral version of The Scattering single "Everything But My Pride". On 5 August 2020, it was announced a vinyl limited edition, with only 300 copies pressed, would be available for purchase solely through DTC, making this the first vinyl edition of one of the band's releases since The Scattering. After Van Eede stated he had planned to do some concerts held in England in 2021 to support the album, the band announced on 7 September 2020 they would be the opening act for Go West's upcoming tour to happen in 2021, but, after the sanitary measures regarding COVID-19 pandemic still happening, the joint tour was postponed to the first half of the following year. The Cutting Crew's setlist for this tour featured several cuts from Ransomed. After concluding touring the UK, Cutting Crew will kick off their 35th Anniversary Tour in Germany.

Members
Current members
 Nick Van Eede (born 14 June 1958) - lead vocals, rhythm guitar, keyboards (1985-1993, 2005–present)
 Tom Arnold - drums (2005–present)
 Gareth Moulton - lead guitar (2005–present)
 Martyn Barker - drums (2013–present)
 Gary Barnacle - saxophone (2013–present)
 Jack Birchwood - brass (2013–present)
 Angela Brooks - backing vocals (2013–present)
 Nik Carter - brass (2013–present)
 TJ Davis - backing vocals (2013–present)
 Joolz Dunkley - guitars, keyboards (2013–present)
 Steven Fuller - brass (2013–present)
 Jono Harrison - keyboards (2013–present)
 Nick Kay - bass (2013–present)
 Mak Norman - bass (2013–present)

Former members
 Martin "Frosty" Beedle (born 18 September 1961) - drums (1985-1993)
 Colin Farley - bass (1985-1993)
 Kevin MacMichael (born 7 November 1951 - died 31 December 2002) - lead guitar (1985-1993)
 Dominic Finley - bass (2005-2008)
 Sam Flynn - keyboards (2005-2008)

Discography

Albums

Studio albums

Compilation albums

Video albums

Singles

Notes

References

External links
 
 VH1 artist profile 
 Cutting Crew official Twitter
 Cutting Crew Music official Facebook

English pop rock music groups
English new wave musical groups
Musical groups established in 1985
Musical groups from London
Virgin Records artists
EMI Records artists
Cherry Red Records artists
1985 establishments in England